Mover of the Earth, Stopper of the Sun is a concert overture for large orchestra that was commissioned by Orchestre national d'Île-de-France (ONDIF) from composer Svitlana Azarova.

The composition is dedicated to Renaissance astronomer Nicolaus Copernicus.

Performances
 World premiere January 23, 2013 at Salle Pleyel, Paris
 Dutch premiere March 1, 2014 at Concertgebouw, Amsterdam, conducted by Marc Albrecht.
 September 17, 2015 at S. Lyudkevych Concert Hall, Lviv, INSO-Lviv Youth Academic Symphony Orchestra, conductor Anna Skryleva
 Residentie orkest was, due to COVID-19_pandemic, alas not able to perform Mover of the Earth, Stopper of the Sun for large orchestra  conducted by 
 6 - 10 March, 2023 Orchestra Project 4 by the symphony orchestra of the Academy of Music and Drama at the University of Gothenburg  Conductor: Henrik Schaefer

Background
The name of this composition was taken from the Nicolaus Copernicus Monument, Toruń which bears a Latin inscription drawn up by Alexander von Humboldt: 
Nicolaus Copernicus Thorunensis, terrae motor, solis caelique stator - Nicolaus Copernicus of Thorun, mover of the earth, stopper of the sun and heavens

In the score Azarova graphically and musically shows Copernicus’s heliocentric cosmology which displaced the Earth from the center of the universe.

Instrumentation

Piccolo, 2 Flutes, 2 Oboes, 2 Clarinets in B, 2 Bassoons, 4 Horns in F, 2 Trumpets in B, 2 Trombones, Bass Trombone. Tuba, Timpani, Strings

Duration: ca. 5'

References

Compositions by Svitlana Azarova
2011 compositions
Concert overtures